Longfield railway station is on the Chatham Main Line in England, serving the villages of Longfield, Hartley, and New Ash Green.

The station and all trains that call are operated by Southeastern.

History

Although situated in Longfield, the station was originally named after Fawkham when it opened in June 1872.  The name of a nearby village was chosen as a local land owner had offered land and cash for provision of a station.

The original station was destroyed by fire around 1900, but rebuilt in the same location.  The railway line through Fawkham station was electrified in 1939 under the Southern Railway with electric trains operating between Victoria and Gillingham.  Steam trains continued to pass through the station on their way to/from the Kent Coast until June 1959 when those services were then also turned over to electric operation under British Railways.

With the start of summer timetable in 1961, the true location of the station was recognised when it was renamed 'Longfield for Fawkham & Hartley' from 12 June.  By the end of the 1960s the cumbersome appendences were dropped in favour of plain Longfield, although the longer name survived on some signs and tickets well into the next decade.

The station building built following the fire of 1900 was demolished in 1971 and replaced by the contemporary CLASP prefabricated design favoured by British Rail.

Usage of the station has grown considerably in the last thirty years, as it rests within a large catchment area of residential development.  The frequency of services and journey times to and from London also attracts commuters away from the slower North Kent Line services provided at Gravesend, Northfleet and Swanscombe stations.

Services
All services at Longfield are operated by Southeastern using ,  and  EMUs.

The typical off-peak service in trains per hour is:
 1 tph to 
 1 tph to  via 

On Sundays, the service is reduced to hourly in each direction.

References

External links

Transport in the Borough of Dartford
Railway stations in Kent
Former London, Chatham and Dover Railway stations
Railway stations in Great Britain opened in 1872
Railway stations served by Southeastern